Djurgården will in the 2007 season compete in the Allsvenskan and Swedish Cup.

The gold medal was a battle between Djurgården and IFK Göteborg. Since Djurgården lost last round against Brommapojkarna and Göteborg beat Trelleborgs FF, Göteborg was the new champion. Kalmar FF won their last match, and took the second place from Djurgården.

Squad

Player statistics
Appearances for competitive matches only

|}

Goals

Total

Allsvenskan

Svenska Cupen

Competitions

Allsvenskan

Matches
Results for Djurgårdens IF for season 2007.

NOTE: scores are written DIF first

Svenska Cupen

I The result was 1–1 after full-time, and 2–2 after overtime. The game had to be decided on penalties which Gefle won with 7–5.

References 

Djurgårdens IF Fotboll seasons
Djurgardens IF